Introduction of Vitaphone Sound Pictures is a 1926 Vitaphone short film released by Warner Brothers on August 6, 1926, that was the first talking film. It utilized the Vitaphone sound-on-disc sound system.

Premise
Will H. Hays, President of the Motion Picture Producers and Distributors of America, introduces the audience to the Vitaphone sound system.

References

External links

1926 films
Warner Bros. films
Warner Bros. short films
American short films
American black-and-white films